Kindergarten is a form of education for young children.

Kindergarten may also refer to:

 Kindergarten (1989 film), an Argentinian film directed by Jorge Polaco; adapted from a novel by Asher Benatar
 Kindergarten (1983 film), a Soviet drama film
 Kindergarten (horse) (born 1937), thoroughbred racehorse from New Zealand
 Kindergarten (TV series), US documentary television broadcast by HBO in 2001
 Kindergarten, Peter Rushforth's debut novel, published in 1979
 "Kindergarten", a song from Faith No More's fourth studio album, Angel Dust (1992)

See also
 Kindergarden (demoparty), a computer art event in Norway
 Milner's Kindergarten, a group of Britons who served in the South African Civil Service during the first decade of the 20th century